{{Infobox Boxingmatch
|fight date    = 24 November 2013
|Fight Name    = The Clash in Cotai
|image         =  
|location      = Cotai Arena, The Venetian, Macau, SAR
|fighter1      = Manny Pacquiao
|nickname1     = Pac-Man
|record1       = 54–5–2 (38 KO)
|hometown1     = General Santos, Philippines
|height1       = 5 ft 6+1/2 in
|weight1       = 145 lb
|style1        = Southpaw
|recognition1  = [[The Ring (magazine)|The Ring]] No. 7 ranked pound-for-pound fighter8-division world champion
|fighter2      = Brandon Rios
|nickname2     = Bam-Bam
|record2       = 31–1–1 (23 KO)
|hometown2     = Lubbock, Texas, U.S.
|height2       = 5 ft 8 in
|weight2       = 146+1/2 lb
|style2        = Orthodox
|recognition2  = 
|titles        = vacant WBO International welterweight title
|result        =  Pacquiao wins via 12-round unanimous decision (120-108, 119-109, 118-110)
}}
Manny Pacquiao vs. Brandon Ríos, billed as The Clash in Cotai, was a boxing welterweight championship fight for the vacant WBO International Welterweight championship. The bout was held on 24 November 2013 at the Venetian Macau resort & hotel in Macau. Pacquiao won via unanimous decision and took the vacant WBO International welterweight title. Pacquiao said that the fight would be dedicated to the victims of the recent typhoon hit in the Philippines. The fight drew 475,000 ppv buys.

National anthem singers

United States (The Star-Spangled Banner)Philippines (Lupang Hinirang)''

Fight card

Main bouts (HBO PPV)
WBO Welterweight bout: Manny Pacquiao vs. Brandon Ríos
Pacquiao won via unanimous decision
IBF Featherweight bout: Evgeny Gradovich (c) vs. Billy Dib
Gradovich won via 9th round TKO.
NABF Heavyweight bout: Andy Ruiz vs. Tor Hamer (c)
Ruiz won via referee technical decision due to Hamer quitting before the start of the 4th round.
Flyweight bout: Zou Shiming vs. Juan Tozcano
Shiming won via unanimous decision.
Lightweight bout: Félix Verdejo vs. Petchsamuthr Duanaaymukdahan
Verdejo won via unanimous decision.

International broadcasting

References

External links

Rios
2013 in boxing
Boxing on HBO
Boxing in Macau
2013 in Macau sport
November 2013 sports events in Asia